Krishna Kumar (born 10 December 1991) is an Indian cricketer. He made his List A debut for Kerala in the 2016–17 Vijay Hazare Trophy on 25 February 2017.

References

External links
 

1991 births
Living people
Indian cricketers
Kerala cricketers
Place of birth missing (living people)